De Vlijt  (English: The Diligence) is a smock mill in Diever, Netherlands. It was built in 1882. The mill is listed as a Rijksmonument, number 12907.

History

A smock mill on this site was burnt down in 1882. A replacement was built by Diever millwright Rietsma, incorporating parts from a drainage mill that formerly stood at Eesterga, Friesland. De Vlijt was last used by wind power 1938 and after that was worked by an oil engine. After 1940 the mill became derelict. In 1955, the mill was restored by millwright H J Huberts of Coevorden. In 1956 the mill restarted commercial operation, and was worked until 1965. Further restoration of the mill was carried out in 1978. In 1979, the mill was purchased by the local authority in Westerveld.

Description

De Vlijt is what the Dutch describe as an "achtkante stellingmolen", a smock mill with a stage. It has a three-storey base and a two-storey smock. The smock and cap are thatched. The four Common sails have aerodynamic lift creating devices on the leading edge using the Fauël system. The sails are carried on a cast-iron windshaft which was cast in 1858 by millwright Fyenoord. It carries the brake wheel, which has 48 teeth. This drives the wallower (27 cogs) at the top of the upright shaft. At the bottom of the upright shaft the great spur wheel with 93 cogs drives the lantern pinion stone nut with 25 staves. This drives the single pair of French Burr millstones. A second pair of millstones is driven by electric motor.

Public access

De Vlijt is open to the public on Saturdays from 09:00 to 12:00 (January to April and September to December) and from 09:00 to 16:00 (June to August).

References

Windmills in Drenthe
Smock mills in the Netherlands
Windmills completed in 1882
Rijksmonuments in Drenthe
Octagonal buildings in the Netherlands
De Vlijt, Diever